The First Women's Basketball League of North Macedonia is the highest women's professional club basketball competition in North Macedonia.

History

Current season teams (2013–2014)

Champions

List of champions

External links
 Profile at eurobasket.com

Macedonia
Basketball leagues in North Macedonia
1992 establishments in the Republic of Macedonia
Sports leagues established in 1992
lea
basketball